The NBL1 South presents seven annual awards to recognise its teams, players, and coaches for their accomplishments. Each award has a male and female awardee.

Individual awards

Most Valuable Player

Defensive Player of the Year

Youth Player of the Year

Coach of the Year

Referee of the Year

Honours

All-Star Five

Club of the Year

See also

List of National Basketball League (Australia) awards
List of WNBL awards
List of National Basketball League (New Zealand) awards

References

External links

NBL1
Basketball trophies and awards
Australian sports trophies and awards